Hilary Lavender Mason (4 September 1917 – 5 September 2006) was an English character actress who appeared in a wide variety of roles, mainly on UK television. 

Mason was born in Birmingham and trained at the London School of Dramatic Art, before performing with repertory theatres throughout Britain. She is probably best known internationally for her performance as the blind psychic in Nicolas Roeg's film Don't Look Now. 

Mason had the starring role in Mistress of Hardwick, a 10-part BBC series broadcast in 1972, which followed the life of Bess of Hardwick. Most of the episodes are now lost.

She appeared in "Gunfight at the O.K. Laundrette", the pilot episode of ITV's critically acclaimed drama Minder.
She also made regular appearances in Z-Cars and Dixon of Dock Green, and made an appearance in Ripping Yarns.
In the 1985 BBC serial ‘’Miss Marple’’: The Moving Finger, she appeared as Emily Barton. In 1986 she appeared as Mrs Gummidge in the BBC series David Copperfield. Mason appeared in an episode of Juliet Bravo as Mrs Unwin in an episode called "Friends and Neighbours".

In later years Mason appeared as Gladys in the popular children's TV show Maid Marian and her Merry Men. One of her last roles was in the children's programme Aquila.

Filmography

References

External links

Independent obituary

Actresses from London
English stage actresses
English film actresses
English television actresses
1917 births
2006 deaths